Lubiechowa  is a village in the administrative district of Gmina Świerzawa, within Złotoryja County, Lower Silesian Voivodeship, in southwestern Poland.

The village has a population of 640.

References

Lubiechowa